Agni Natchathiram is a 1988 Indian Tamil-language masala film that was written and directed by Mani Ratnam. The film stars Prabhu, Karthik, Amala and newcomer Nirosha, with Vijayakumar, Jayachitra, Sumithra, Tara, S. N. Lakshmi and G. Umapathy in supporting roles. Its story revolves around two half-brothers who come into conflict with each other due to their claims for legitimacy as sons of a common father.

Ratnam intended Agni Natchathiram to follow Mouna Ragam (1986); he completed the script but chose to prioritise Nayakan. Although some scenes were filmed during a break from Nayakan, production on Agni Natchathiram stalled for nearly a year and resumed in late 1987 after Nayakans release. Agni Natchathiram was produced by Ratnam's brother G. Venkateswaran; it was filmed by P. C. Sreeram, and edited by B. Lenin and V. T. Vijayan.

Agni Natchathiram was released on 15 April 1988, the week of the Tamil New Year festival Puthandu, and became a box-office success, running in theatres for over 200 days. The film won two Filmfare Awards South, three Tamil Nadu State Film Awards, and five Cinema Express Awards. It became a trendsetter in Tamil cinema, set a new standard in the use of lighting, and was remade in Hindi as Vansh (1992).

Plot 
In Madras, half-brothers Gautham and Ashok are the sons of senior government Indian Administrative Service (IAS) official Vishwanath. Gautham's mother is Vishwanath's first wife Susheela, and Ashok's mother is Vishwanath's second wife Kamala. Both Gautham and Ashok inappropriately express their anger towards their father to others, and display open antipathy towards each other.

Gautham, a trainee Indian Police Service (IPS) officer, meets the Commissioner's daughter Anjali and they slowly become lovers. After graduating from the police academy, Gautham is appointed Assistant Commissioner in Madras. Around the same time, Ashok meets a mysterious girl and they also form a romantic relationship. Meanwhile, Vishwanath is appointed head of an inquiry commission to investigate a nefarious factory owner called Chidambaram.

One night, Ashok and his friends run into Gautham and Anjali; one of Ashok's friends teases Gautham, who arrests Ashok's friend on an invented charge. Enraged, Ashok and his gang throw stones at Gautham's house, accidentally injuring Susheela. The next day, Gautham arrests Ashok after provoking him into attacking him. Because Vishwanath is out of town, Susheela helps Kamala bail Ashok and offers snide, unsolicited advice about raising her children to be law-abiding. Meanwhile, Chidambaram repeatedly tries to bribe Vishwanath but is rebuffed and orders an assault on Vishwanath.

On the day when Ashok's sister Mallika is meeting a prospective groom's family for a matchmaking ceremony, Vishwanath fails to arrive, causing the groom's family to question the seriousness of the marriage between Kamala and Vishwanath. Ashok is enraged; he goes to Vishwanath's house and berates him but realises his paternal grandmother has died; Gautham throws him out. Later, Ashok learns his girlfriend also comes from a broken family. The Commissioner learns of Gautham's romance with Anjali and, based on his father's behaviour, doubts his monogamy.

Mallika runs into Gautham and Anjali on a commuter train; Gautham protects her from ruffians hired by Chidambaram to harass her, and he and Anjali accompany Mallika home safely. Mallika addresses Gautham as her elder brother but before he can respond, Ashok arrives and throws him out. Another altercation occurs at a wedding. The next day, they get into a huge brawl in public. Vishwanath berates them both, lamenting his public humiliation at his sons' behaviour.

While Vishwanath is leaving his office, he is run over by a truck driven by one of Chidambaram's thugs and becomes comatose. Mutual fear brings the families closer as Susheela and Kamala wait by his bedside. Chidambaram arranges for Vishwanath's murder in the hospital. When the thugs attack, Gautham and Ashok foil the murder attempt by switching to the ambulance that Vishwanath was in. The next day, the brothers take the bandaged Vishwanath into the commission's office to submit evidence of Chidambaram's crimes. Chidambaram is arrested and the brothers high five each other.

Cast 

 Prabhu as Gautham Vishwanath
 Karthik as Ashok Vishwanath
 Amala as Anjali
 Nirosha as Ashok's girlfriend
 Vijayakumar as Vishwanath
 V. K. Ramasamy as Chettiar
 Janagaraj as Lakshmipathi
 Jayachitra as Kamala
 Sumithra as Susheela
 Tara as Mallika
 S. N. Lakshmi as Vishwanath's mother
 Disco Shanti as the prostitute
 G. Umapathy as Chidambaram
 Prabhu Deva (special appearance in the song "Raaja Raajathi")

Production

Development 
After Mouna Ragam (1986), Mani Ratnam wrote the script for Agni Natchathiram, with which he intended to reach out to audiences he could not reach with Mouna Ragam. However, when Muktha Srinivasan approached Ratnam to make a film for Kamal Haasan, which eventually became Nayakan, he agreed. Agni Natchathiram was produced by Ratnam's brother G. Venkateswaran, filmed by P. C. Sreeram, and edited by B. Lenin and V. T. Vijayan. Thota Tharani was the art director and Mugur Sundar was the dance choreographer.

Casting and filming 

Agni Natchathiram is the second time after Mouna Ragam Karthik collaborated with Ratnam. It is the feature-film debut of Raadhika's sister Nirosha, who was not initially interested in pursuing an acting career, having previously declined an offer to act in Nayakan, but at Raadhika's suggestion she joined this film. Vijayakumar, who had quit films and had settled in the United States, had returned to India for a different purpose when assistant director K. Subash met and offered him a role in Agni Natchathiram. Vijayakumar initially refused but Subash remained adamant; when Ratnam narrated the script, Vijayakumar was impressed with the character and accepted the role. G. Umapathy made his acting debut, playing the antagonist Chidambaram.

In January 1987, after two weeks of filming for Nayakan, Ratnam resumed work on Agni Natchathiram, filming scenes with Prabhu and Amala such as the song "Ninnukkori Varnam". Ratnam, however, could not manage filming for two films at the same time so work on Agni Natchathiram was halted for nearly a year, resuming only after Nayakans release in late 1987. To make the film more commercially viable, a comedy subplot involving a middle-aged man (V. K. Ramasamy) and his chauffeur (Janagaraj) trying to cavort with a prostitute (Disco Shanti) without their wives' knowledge was created. Two backup dancers did not arrive for the filming of the dance song "Raaja Raajathi", so Sundar persuaded his son Prabhu Deva to perform the breakdance in the song. The entire climax was filmed with strobe light effects.

Soundtrack 
Ilaiyaraaja composed the music for the soundtrack of Agni Natchathiram and Vaali wrote the lyrics. Many of the songs are set in Carnatic ragas; "Vaa Vaa Anbe Anbe" is in Shivaranjani, "Thoongatha Vizhigal" is in Amritavarshini, "Oru Poonga Vanam" is in Sudhadhanyasi, and "Ninnukkori Varnam" is in Mohanam. For "Raaja Raajathi", Ilaiyaraaja used no string instruments and composed the opening stanza with only two notes. Anand–Milind adapted the song as "Tap Tap Tapori" for Baaghi (1990). For the Telugu dubbed version titled Gharsana, all the lyrics are written by Rajasri.

Release 
Agni Natchathiram was released on 15 April 1988, the week of  Puthandu, the Tamil New Year festival. It ran in theatres for over 200 days, becoming a silver jubilee film and Ratnam's most-profitable film to that point. The film was also dubbed in Telugu as Gharsana.

Critical reception 
S. Shivakumar, writing for Mid-Day, called Agni Natchathiram "Mani's loosely scripted work to date" and said; "What emerges on the screen is frothy and cracks like fresh pop corn". N. Krishnaswamy of The Indian Express wrote the film has "more light than heat", referring to the impact Sriram's technique had on the film, and criticised the comedy subplot. Ananda Vikatan wrote Ratnam proved he could make an interesting and engaging film with just a small thread of script, and that he had imagined each scene differently and presented them interestingly, giving the film a rating of 45 out of 100. Jayamanmadhan of Kalki criticised the film for Ratnam's direction and writing.

Accolades

Legacy 
Indian film critic  Baradwaj Rangan considers Agni Natchathiram a defining Tamil film for the youth of the 1980s. It became a trendsetter in Tamil cinema for setting "a new standard in the use of lighting". Lakshmipathy's dialogue "En pondatti orrukku poittaa" ("My wife has gone to her town"), which is spoken in excitement when his wife leaves for her hometown, entered Tamil vernacular. The dialogue also inspired a song of the same name in Nenjam Marappathillai (2021). In 2004, Rediff.com appreciated Agni Natchathiram for its "[s]ubtlety, diffused lighting, realistic fights, plain logic, a controlled Prabhu and a livewire Kartik", calling it a "landmark movie which never got the recognition it deserved up north". In 2018, Rangan called Agni Natchathiram one of the best films in the masala genre, though he noted elements such as the loosu ponnu character played by Amala and the "flashy, MTV-era cinematography" did not age well. The film was remade in Hindi as Vansh (1992).

Notes

References

Bibliography

External links 

1980s Tamil-language films
1988 films
Fictional portrayals of the Tamil Nadu Police
Films directed by Mani Ratnam
Films scored by Ilaiyaraaja
Indian police films
1980s masala films
Polygamy in fiction
Tamil films remade in other languages